Nebria laticollis laticollis is a subspecies of ground beetle in the Nebriinae subfamily that can be found in France, Italy, and Switzerland.

References

External links
Nebria laticollis laticollis at Carabidae of the World

Beetles described in 1826
Beetles of Europe